Luca Schuler (born 17 January 1998) is a Swiss freestyle skier. He was born in Schwyz. 
He competed at the 2014 Winter Olympics in Sochi, in slopestyle.

References

External links
 
 
 
 

1998 births
Living people
Swiss male freestyle skiers
Olympic freestyle skiers of Switzerland
Freestyle skiers at the 2014 Winter Olympics
Sportspeople from the canton of Schwyz
21st-century Swiss people